Alberta Provincial Highway No. 8, commonly referred to as Highway 8, is a highway in Southern Alberta that connects Highway 22 in Rocky View County, just north of Redwood Meadows, to Calgary.

Route description 
Highway 8 begins west of Calgary in a rural area of Rocky View County. After a signalized intersection at Clearwater Drive / Lott Creek Boulevard, the highway then descends into the Elbow River valley before veering slightly north to cross the river, entering Calgary city limits almost immediately thereafter at 101 Street SW. East of 101 Street SW, Highway 8 becomes Highway 201 with the roadway becoming part of Stoney Trail, with it becoming a freeway and meeting a stack interchange with Sarcee Trail and Glenmore Trail that opened in 2020. The West Ring Road portion of Stoney Trail, which is to connect Highway 8 with the Trans Canada Highway (Highway 1), is scheduled to be completed in 2024, but in the mean time Highway 8 becomes Highway 201 when entering Calgary.

Many commercial maps show Highway 8 continuing east through Calgary along Glenmore Trail to Highway 2 (Deerfoot Trail); however, the route is unsigned.

History
In the late 1800s, Calgary was a small town at the confluence of the Elbow and Bow Rivers. A lightly travelled road led away from the town to the southwest, following the alignment of present-day Richmond Road. In the early 20th century it was called South Morley Road before being renamed to Richmond Road, and eventually led west to Springbank, Alberta remaining north of the Elbow River. A spur from the road at 101 Street SW proceeding due south across the river had been constructed by the mid‑1920s, known as Bragg Creek Road. South of the river, it veered west following the present day alignment of Highway 8 to its current terminus, where it turned south to Bragg Creek on the alignment of present-day Highway 22.

The first use of Highway 8 was as a small connector route that connected Calgary with the town of Bowness. Highway 8 began at 10 Street NW, which at the time was part of Highway 1 which passed through Downtown Calgary, crossed the Bow River along the Louise Bridge, and proceeded north and west towards Cochrane and Banff. Highway 8 travelled west on Kensington Road and Parkdale Boulevard along the north side of the Bow River, becoming Bowness Road when it entered the village of Montgomery. It crossed the original Shouldice Bridge (renamed the John Hextal Bridge) into Bowness and ended near Bowness Park. The highway was decommissioned in  when Montgomery and Bowness were annexed by the City of Calgary.

In the mid 1970s, Alberta introduced its Secondary Highway system (present day 500-900 series highways), and Richmond Road west of Calgary was designated as Secondary Highway 559, but was renumbered in 1979 to Highway 8. Highway 8 first followed Richmond Road into Calgary to Sarcee Trail, and followed Sarcee Trail and Glenmore Trail as an unsigned highway to Deerfoot Trail. When the residential community of Signal Hill was developed in the late 1980s and Highway 8 was realigned in 1992 to the south along a new two lane roadway which also served as a western extension of Glenmore Trail. Despite it being part of Glenmore Trail, the new roadway ended a T-intersection at the transition between the existing Sarcee and Glenmore Trails; resulting in "Glenmore Trail" commonly referring to the roadway east of Sarcee Trail and "Highway 8" referring to the roadway west of Sarcee Trail, despite both officially sharing the same designations.

When the Calgary Ring Road alignment was established, it was determined that the West Leg and Southwest Leg would follow and area just east of 101 Street SW from Highway 1 south to Highway 8, travel east on Highway 8 to Sarcee Trail, and then resume heading south through the eastern perimeter of the Tsuutʼina Nation – as part of the construction the effected area of Highway 8 would become part of Stoney Trail. On October 1, 2020, upgrades to Highway 8 and the stack interchange were opened and the highway inside the ring road was redesigned as Highway 201.

Future
As part of the Southwest Ring Road construction, approximately  Highway 8 will be twinned west of Calgary city limits, while a new Y-interchange at the eastern terminus of Highway 8 is scheduled to be completed in 2024 as part of the West Ring Road. Long-term plans call to twin the remainder of the route to Highway 22 as well as replacing the existing roundabout with an interchange, with provisions for a western extension beyond Highway 22.

Major intersections

See also 
Transportation in Calgary

References 

008
Roads in Calgary